Pia Zinck (born 4 May 1971) is a retired female high jumper from Denmark. She is a seven-time national champion (1992–1998) in the women's high jump.

Zinck finished eighth at the 1996 European Indoor Championships and twelfth at the 1997 World Championships. She also competed at the 1994 European Championships, the 1995 World Championships and the 1997 World Indoor Championships without reaching the final.

Her personal best jump is 1.94 metres, achieved in the qualifying round at the 1997 World Championships. It’s still the national record.

Competition record

References

1971 births
Living people
Danish female high jumpers